Student Bodies is a 1981 American parody slasher film written and directed by Mickey Rose, with an uncredited Michael Ritchie co-directing. A spoof of slasher horror films such as Halloween, Friday the 13th and Prom Night, Student Bodies was the first film to satirize the thriving slasher film genre. A prominent feature of the film is a body count that is superimposed onscreen whenever a death occurs.

Plot
Student Bodies is about a serial killer who stalks students at Lamab High School, while at the same time, voyeuristically watching them. The killer calls himself "the Breather", presumably because the killer is always breathing heavily.

The Breather enjoys stalking victims over the telephone and hates seeing youngsters having sex. The Breather uses many unusual objects to kill his female victims such as a paper clip, a chalkboard eraser and a horsehead bookend.

The film itself ends with several twists: initially, it is revealed that the Principal and his elderly female assistant are working as a duo as "the Breather", even though they are shown at one point in the film in the same room as other characters when the Breather contacts the school in order to threaten to commit further murders. The film then goes to reveal that the entire film was a fevered dream, caused by the main character Toby being sick and consumed by overwhelming sexual repression. In a send-up of the film The Wizard of Oz, many characters are revealed to be much the opposite of what they appeared to be for the bulk of the film: the jock-like shop instructor is really the school's French teacher, the stuck-up would-be prom queen is actually the school nerd (who is given the crown by Toby after she wakes up, due to her kind nature), the two handicapped kids turn out to be ablebodied, and a local ROTC cadet is a hippie.

After being released from the hospital, Toby and her boyfriend are about to have sex, at which point he puts on gloves similar to the ones worn by the Breather and strangles Toby, as he has lost respect for her. However, in a homage to the nightmare-ending of the film Carrie, Toby's hands rise up from the freshly dug grave after her funeral to attack her killer.

Cast
 Kristen Riter as Toby Badger
 Matt Goldsby as Hardy
 Cullen G. Chambers as Charles Ray
 Richard Belzer as the Breather (credited as Richard Brando)
 Joe Flood as Mr. Dumpkin
 Joe Talarowski as Principal Harlow Hebrew Peters
 Mimi Weddell as Miss Mumsley
 Dario Jones as Mawamba
 Carl Jacobs as Dr. Sigmund
 Peggy Cooper as Ms. Van Dyke
 Janice E. O'Malley as Nurse Krud
 Kevin Mannis as Scott
 Sara Eckhardt as Patti Priswell
 Oscar James as Football Coach/Sheriff
 Kay Ogden as Ms. Leclair
 "The Stick" (Patrick Boone Varnell) as Malvert The Janitor
 Brian Batytis as Wheels
 Joan Browning Jacobs as Mrs. Hummers
 Angela Bressler as Julie
 Keith Singleton as Charlie

Production
Student Bodies features a cast of true unknowns; most of them, including leads Riter and Goldsby, have never made another feature film. (Riter did appear as a dancer in the J. Geils Band's "Centerfold" music video; her resemblance to MTV's Martha Quinn led to an urban legend that the VJ was in the video.) Third-billed Cullen Chambers has appeared in numerous films and TV shows since 1981, but his main employment has been as a body double for such actors as Morgan Freeman, Denzel Washington and Forest Whitaker. The best-known performer in the film is probably Mimi Weddell, an actress in her 60s who later went on to play several roles on film and TV, including a grandmother in the hit series Sex and the City. Future judge and Texas Senator Sarah Eckhardt appears in a small role, while comedian Richard Belzer was the voice of the Breather.

Mickey Rose wrote and directed the film, with executive producer Jerry Belson offering additional material; however, Michael Ritchie was placed on set as an overseeing producer to guide Rose should he need it. Some sources say that Ritchie was actually the co-director/writer and had to take the "Alan Smithee" credit due to a strike by the Writers Guild of America; others maintain that he took said credit to distance himself from the project. Mickey Rose was (and is) also a WGA member and received full credit; this would seem to debunk the "union problem" rumors.

R-rating
Student Bodies contains no sex, nudity, graphic violence or even foul language—until 26 minutes into the film, when the action is interrupted by a man sitting at a desk. He explains that, in order to achieve an R-rating, a film "must contain full frontal nudity, graphic violence, or an explicit reference to the sex act". He intones that R-rated films are by far the most popular, so "the producers of this motion picture have asked me to take this opportunity to say... 'Fuck you'". A slide indicating that the film has been indeed given an R-rating by the MPAA appears for a few seconds (a rare instance of the MPAA rating appearing during a film), after which the movie continues.

Parodies
The film parodies several slasher and horror films, including Carnival of Souls, Black Christmas, Carrie, Halloween, When a Stranger Calls, The Shining, Friday the 13th and Prom Night.

"The Stick"
One of the film's oddest aspects is a character called Malvert, a creepy-looking janitor (itself a familiar trope in slasher films). Malvert mumbles, does bizarre things like urinate into wastepaper baskets ("Sometimes Malvert pee red!" being one of the film's more memorable lines) and moves about in a herky-jerky fashion (at film's end, Malvert is revealed to be something of a sophisticate; when Toby informs him that he was a janitor in her dream, he responds, "Absurd!").

Malvert was played by a tall, double-jointed stand-up comedian known only as "the Stick", who made no other films; his only other credit seems to be as a guest appearance in the pilot episode on the 1984 TV series Out of Control. Several online reviews give the film itself a mixed reaction, but praise the Stick's performance. According to an obituary in Corsicana Daily Sun, The Stick's real identity was Patrick Boone Varnell (1941-89), who was born in Lawton, Oklahoma and died at Medical City Hospital in Dallas on May 7, 1989.

Filming locations
Lamar Consolidated Junior High School in Richmond, Texas – called Lamab in the film (not to be confused with Lamar High School in Houston, Texas which is known for its use in the film Rushmore) - and James E. Taylor High School in Katy, Texas were used for the film's football stadium, as well as for exterior and some interior scenes. The parade scene was filmed in downtown Houston, on Main Street. Additional scenes were filmed on the campus of Texas Southern University, with Hannah Hall (the administration building) used for classroom and hallway shots. Members of TSU's football team were also used in the movie.

The 1980 Thomas Jefferson High School Yellow Jackets football team sporting their maroon and gold school colors played the visiting football team in the film.

Release
One of a group of films directed towards teenaged audiences during the late 1970s and early 1980s, Student Bodies grossed $5.2 million at the box office. It became famous as a late-night cult favorite on cable afterwards, appearing frequently on the Rhonda Shear-hosted USA Up All Night, as well as the network's USA Saturday Nightmares double feature series. The DVD was released on June 3, 2007. The HD Blu-ray version was released on May 3, 2011.

Critical reception
Vincent Canby of The New York Times called the film "a real disappointment", writing that it "just slowly topples over as you watch it, like a stand-up comedian in the act of failing". Variety found that the jokes became "depressingly repetitive", writing that "unfortunately, once you've seen the trailer, you've seen all but one of the good gags included in the entire film, meaning that there are about three minutes of effective material over the course of the 86-minute running time". Gene Siskel of the Chicago Tribune gave it two stars out of four, writing that it "exposes all its comic tricks in the first reel, suggesting that the genre itself is not all that deep and that there may be less to parody than one might think". Linda Gross of the Los Angeles Times wrote: "The film has some very funny moments, but it is definitely not another Airplane!". Gary Arnold of The Washington Post wrote: "Although it frequently misfires and occasionally keeps firing away on empty satiric chambers, Student Bodies is a likeably sarcastic and knowing assault on the clichés of horror movies". AllMovie wrote, "Student Bodies, though occasionally very funny, is not consistent enough to recommend as a comedy or scary enough to be an effective horror film."

References

External links
 
 

1981 films
1981 horror films
1980s comedy horror films
1980s high school films
1980s parody films
1980s serial killer films
1980s slasher films
1980s teen comedy films
1980s teen horror films
American comedy horror films
American high school films
American parody films
American serial killer films
American slasher films
American teen comedy films
American teen horror films
Films directed by Michael Ritchie
Films set in Houston
Films shot in Houston
Paramount Pictures films
Films about proms
Parodies of horror
1981 comedy films
1980s English-language films
1980s American films